Eurosonic Noorderslag is an annual four-day music showcase festival and conference held in January in Groningen, Netherlands. The first three days of the festival (Eurosonic) feature artists from all over Europe, the last day of the festival (Noorderslag) features only Dutch artists.  The conference is held during all four days of the event. Several awards are presented during Eurosonic Noorderslag: the Music Moves Europe Talent Awards, the European Festivals Awards, the Buma Cultuur Pop Award (Popprijs), the Pop Media Award (Pop Media Prijs), The Feather (De Veer), the "Iron Venue and Festival Animals" (Ijzeren Podiumdieren) and the Buma Music Meets Tech Award.

Eurosonic 
The first three days of the event (Wednesday, Thursday and Friday) are referred to as the Eurosonic festival. Eurosonic takes place in multiple venues across the center of Groningen. It features artists from all over Europe. Every year the organization chooses one country as focus country highlighted during the festival.

Noorderslag 
It features only Dutch artists and includes the announcement of the winner of the Buma Cultuur Pop Award. Since 2008 the festival is broadcast live by the NOS (Dutch Broadcasting Foundation).

Eurosonic Air 

Started in 2011 to celebrate the 25 anniversary of Eurosonic Noorderslag, Eurosonic Air is a free open air festival hosted on a stage on the main square (Grote Markt) of Groningen. A large "umbrella" or tent is placed in front of the stage which determines the look of the square during the festival.

Conference 
During all four days of the event a conference is held. The conference features several specialized programs such as EPIC (the European Production Innovation Conference) and Buma Music Meets Tech. During the conference a meeting is held for the European Talent Exchange Program (ETEP), which was founded by Eurosonic Noorderslag.

Grunnsonic and unofficial events during Eurosonic Noorderslag 
In 2007 Grunnsonic was added to Eurosonic Noorderslag as a third festival. It offers artists from Groningen the chance to showcase in front of an international audience. Though the performances taking place under the name Grunnsonic are listed on the Eurosonic Noorderslag website and the participating artists are considered to be participating in Eurosonic Noorderslag, a Eurosonic Noorderslag ticket or conference registration is not required to visit Grunnsonic performances.

With the exception of Eurosonic Air and Grunnsonic, the performances of Eurosonic Noorderslag can only be visited by people who have bought tickets or are participating in the conference. Simultaneously free concerts are organized all over the city centre in pubs, bar dancings, art galleries.

History 
On 4 January 1986 the "Holland-Belgium festival" was organized in De Oosterpoort in Groningen as a battle between Dutch and Belgian pop bands. Though not yet carrying the name, this is considered the first edition of Noorderslag. Following the success of this event in 1987 the festival is organized again, now using the name "Noorderslag". The event is now advertised as a battle between bands from the northern Netherlands and the rest of the country. In 1988 the third edition is promoted as a regular festival, there is no longer a battle element. In November 1988 the EBU-festival "Eurorock", a three-day festival with European bands is held in De Oosterpoort. As a consequence, Noorderslag is not organized in January 1989.

In 1990 a seminar for music industry professionals is added to the festival, making the event notable on a national level. 1992 is the first year the winner of the Buma Cultuur Pop Award is announced at Noorderslag. In 1993 the festival "Noorderslagting" is organized so bands from Groningen can showcase themselves on the Friday before Noorderslag to the music industry professionals who are already in the city to visit Noorderslag. In 1996 the "Euroslagt" festival is renamed to "Euroslag", which is subsequently renamed to "Eurosonic" in 1999. It drew about 1800 visitors and featured artists from twelve countries playing across ten venues. Eurosonic 2000 sells 2200 tickets in presale, selling out the event. It features fifty acts in thirteen venues (fifteen stages) and is bigger than any previous edition. Eurosonic 2001 grows to 90 artists playing across 14 venues, creating a total of 21 stages. Eurosonic 2002 featured over a 100 artists across 19 venues with a total of 25 stages.

In 2007 the first edition of "Grunnsonic" is organized, the festival is added to Eurosonic and Noorderslag to allow acts from Groningen to show themselves to a bigger audience. In 2009 the sixth edition of the European Border Breakers Awards is held at De Oosterpoort on the opening night of Eurosonic Noorderslag. Also, the name of the event is officially changed to "Eurosonic Noorderslag".

In 2011 the first edition of "Eurosonic Air" is held, to celebrate the 25th anniversary of the event. 2011 was also the first year the event lasted four days, Eurosonic now starting on Wednesday.

Tickets for the 2012 festival were sold out within ten minutes. During the 2012 festival Buma/Stemra, theFactor.e and Eurosonic Noorderslag organized the fifth edition of the annual Interactive Awards.

Between 2008 and 2011 the Lex van Rossen Award was presented at Eurosonic Noorderslag.

The 2013 edition drew 35,000 visitors.

Tickets for the 2014 festival sold out within hours, tickets for Noorderslag selling out within the first minutes of the sale. The edition saw a record number of 38,500 visitors.

In December 2015 IMPALA awarded Eurosonic Noorderslag the "outstanding contribution to independent music" award.

The 2015 edition of the event drew a total of 41,200 visitors of 42 nationalities and featured 345 acts. The 2015 conference had 3,900 participants.

In 2016 Eurosonic Air will take place in a tent for the first time, to make the atmosphere closer to the rest of the festival. The tent will have a capacity of 3,000 people and include balconies. During Eurosonic Air, the North Netherlands Symphony Orchestra (Noord Nederlands Orkest) will play the program "What's on David Bowie's playlist?", inspired by the "David Bowie is" exhibition at the Groninger Museum. Between the announcement of the performance and the performance itself David Bowie died of cancer at age 69. The attendance for the 2016 edition was reported as 42,100. 4,100 professionals participated in the conference.

Editions

See also
 Ireland in the Eurosonic Festival

External links 

 
 Archive with former acts

References 

 
Music festivals in the Netherlands
Groningen (city)
Music in Groningen (city)
Pop music festivals
Events in Groningen (province)
1986 establishments in the Netherlands
Music festivals established in 1986
Winter events in the Netherlands